Rajesh Deshpande (born 22 October 1961) is an Indian cricket umpire. He made his debut in first-class cricket as umpire on 19 November 2000 in a Ranji Trophy match between Bihar and Orissa. He has appeared in 7 IPL matches and 59 Ranji Trophy matches.

References

1961 births
Living people
Indian cricket umpires